The 1901–02 Wisconsin Badgers men's basketball team represented University of Wisconsin–Madison. The head coach was James C. Elsom, his fourth season with the Badgers. The team played their home games at the Red Gym in Madison, Wisconsin and was a member of the Western Conference.

Schedule

|-
!colspan=12| Regular Season

References

Wisconsin Badgers men's basketball seasons
Wisconsin
1901 in sports in Wisconsin
1902 in sports in Wisconsin